Hayden Ballantyne (born 16 July 1987) is a former Australian rules footballer who played for the Fremantle Football Club in the Australian Football League. He was a 2014 All Australian and has previously won a Sandover Medal while playing with Peel Thunder.

Early career
Only 174 cm tall, Ballantyne started his career with Peel Thunder in the West Australian Football League in 2005 as a midfielder. In 2008, Ballantyne moved into the forward line with great success, kicking 75 goals to finish second in the Bernie Naylor Medal behind Subiaco's Brad Smith, and winning the Sandover Medal by 2 votes from Callum Chambers as the fairest and best player in the league. To recognise this achievement, Peel Thunder named the outer wing at Rushton Park the Hayden Ballantyne Wing in April 2009.

AFL career
Ballantyne's success in the WAFL attracted the attention of AFL recruiters, and at the age of 21, he was drafted by the Fremantle Football Club with its second round selection in the 2008 AFL National Draft (pick No. 21 overall). Ballantyne risked being excluded from the draft when he missed the Western Australian state screening session due to being overseas on a holiday.  He was later tested individually and allowed to remain nominated for the draft. Ballantyne was a mature-age draftee at the age of 21, with most draftees no older than 18.

Ballantyne won the 2011 AFL Goal of the Year in a play which saw him gather three possessions before goaling from 45 metres out.

In his role as a small forward, Ballantyne became noted for his ability to pester and annoy his opponents, and to often win free kicks by encouraging overzealous retaliation from them. In April 2012, the Herald Sun newspaper named him as the league's "chief pest" for his success in this aspect of the game, in the week after champion Geelong full-back Matthew Scarlett had received a three-week suspension for such a retaliatory punch (Ballantyne himself was suspended for one week for a separate incident in the same match). Ballantyne received some criticism following his lacklustre performance in the 2013 AFL Grand Final, which Fremantle lost by 15 points.

At the end of the 2017 season, Ballantyne signed a one-year contract extension.
In August 2018, he signed a further one-year contract extension for the 2019 season. In August 2019 Ballantyne was informed that he would not be offered a contract extension for 2020.

Post-AFL career
Ballantyne signed with Peel Thunder for the 2020 WAFL Season.

In January 2021 Ballantyne announced his retirement from the WAFL competition.

Personal life
Ballantyne's father, Graeme Ballantyne is a horse trainer based at Lark Hill, Rockingham.  The winner of the 2013 Perth Cup, Talent Show, is trained by Graeme and part owned by Hayden and his Fremantle teammate Nick Suban.

On 30 September 2018 Ballantyne's brother Brendan Ballantyne was struck by a pizza delivery car on Ennis Avenue in Waikiki and was killed. He was engaged to his fianceè, who was pregnant with their second child. He was 22.

Statistics
 Statistics are correct to the end of the 2019 season

|-
|- 
! scope="row" style="text-align:center" | 2009
|style="text-align:center;"|
| 17 || 8 || 10 || 9 || 64 || 23 || 87 || 25 || 14 || 1.3 || 1.1 || 8.0 || 2.9 || 10.9 || 3.1 || 1.8
|- style="background-color: #EAEAEA"
! scope="row" style="text-align:center" | 2010
|style="text-align:center;"|
| 1 || 19 || 33 || 17 || 180 || 85 || 265 || 64 || 62 || 1.7 || 0.9 || 9.5 || 4.5 || 13.9 || 3.4 || 3.3
|- 
! scope="row" style="text-align:center" | 2011
|style="text-align:center;"|
| 1 || 17 || 23 || 19 || 190 || 66 || 256 || 52 || 59 || 1.4 || 1.1 || 11.2 || 3.9 || 15.1 || 3.1 || 3.5
|- style="background-color: #EAEAEA"
! scope="row" style="text-align:center" | 2012
|style="text-align:center;"|
| 1 || 21 || 31 || 17 || 236 || 81 || 317 || 58 || 79 || 1.5 || 0.8 || 11.2 || 3.9 || 15.1 || 2.8 || 3.8
|- 
! scope="row" style="text-align:center" | 2013
|style="text-align:center;"|
| 1 || 21 || 34 || 30 || 204 || 72 || 276 || 82 || 66 || 1.6 || 1.4 || 9.7 || 3.4 || 13.1 || 3.9 || 3.1
|- style="background-color: #EAEAEA"
! scope="row" style="text-align:center" | 2014
|style="text-align:center;"|
| 1 || 20 || 49 || 26 || 194 || 49 || 243 || 86 || 54 || 2.5 || 1.3 || 9.7 || 2.5 || 12.2 || 4.3 || 2.7
|- 
! scope="row" style="text-align:center" | 2015
|style="text-align:center;"|
| 1 || 15 || 15 || 13 || 119 || 50 || 169 || 36 || 59 || 1.0 || 0.9 || 7.9 || 3.3 || 11.3 || 2.4 || 3.9
|- style="background-color: #EAEAEA"
! scope="row" style="text-align:center" | 2016
|style="text-align:center;"|
| 1 || 20 || 26|| 17 || 159 || 84|| 243 || 64 || 60|| 1.3 || 0.8 || 8.0 || 4.2 || 12.2 || 3.2 || 3.0
|- 
! scope="row" style="text-align:center" | 2017
|style="text-align:center;"|
| 1 || 10 || 11 || 7 || 71 || 33 || 104 || 32 || 34 || 1.1 || 0.7 || 7.1 || 3.3 || 10.4 || 3.2 || 3.4
|- style="background-color: #EAEAEA"
! scope="row" style="text-align:center" | 2018
|style="text-align:center;"|
| 1 || 17 || 21 || 14 || 127 || 60 || 187 || 57 || 37 || 1.2 || 0.8 || 7.5 || 3.5 || 11.0 || 3.4 || 2.2
|- 
! scope="row" style="text-align:center" | 2019
|style="text-align:center;"|
| 1 || 3 || 1 || 3 || 23 || 10 || 33 || 8 || 6 || 0.3 || 1.0 || 7.7 || 3.3 || 11.0 || 2.7 || 2.0
|- class="sortbottom"
! colspan=3| Career
! 171
! 254
! 172
! 1567
! 613
! 2180
! 564
! 530
! 1.49
! 1.01
! 9.16
! 3.58
! 12.74
! 3.3
! 3.1
|}

References

External links

WAFL profile

1987 births
Living people
Fremantle Football Club players
Peel Thunder Football Club players
All-Australians (AFL)
Sandover Medal winners
Australian rules footballers from Western Australia
People from Mandurah
Australia international rules football team players